Hoverdenia is a monotypic genus of flowering plants belonging to the family Acanthaceae. It only contains one species, Hoverdenia speciosa.

It is native to Mexico.

The genus name of Hoverdenia is in honour of Adrian Josef Graf von Hoverden-Plencken (1798–1875), a Silesian administrator and collector. He was also the president of the former museum in Wrocław. The Latin specific epithet of speciosa refers to speciosus meaning showy.
Both genus and species were first described and published in 1847.

References

Acanthaceae
Acanthaceae genera
Plants described in 1847
Flora of Mexico
Monotypic Lamiales genera